Derrick Leander Monasterio (born August 1, 1995) is a Filipino actor and singer. He was born in Quezon City, Philippines, the son of former Filipina actress Tina Monasterio.

Personal life
Monasterio attended high school at Angelicum College. He is pursuing a Bachelor's degree in Legal Management at San Beda University.

Discography

Studio albums

Filmography

Television

Films

Accolades

Awards and nominations

References

External links

Sparkle profile

1995 births
Living people
Filipino male child actors
Filipino male television actors
People from Quezon City
Male actors from Metro Manila
GMA Network personalities
GMA Music artists
Filipino male film actors
Filipino television variety show hosts